Paksong is a district (muang) of Champasak province in southwestern Laos.

Settlements
Paksong

References

Districts of Champasak province